Park Jin-young, also known as J.Y. Park, is a South Korean singer-songwriter and founder of JYP Entertainment. Since 1994 he has written and composed extensively, both for his own solo albums and for other artists, and has often served as songwriter and producer for artists under his agency. He is known as one of South Korea's most prolific songwriters based on royalty earnings. According to the 2013 earnings report published by the Korea Music Copyright Association, Park ranked first in copyright earnings for a third consecutive year. The information below comes from the Korea Music Copyright Association database; Park Jin-young's search ID is W0203000.

1990s

1994

1995

1996

1997

1998

1999

2000s

2010s

2010

2011

2012

2013

2014

2015

2016

2017

2018

2019

2020s

2020

2021

2022

References

 
Park Jin-young